The Ensuring Lasting Smiles Act is a proposed United States law that would require private health insurance plans to cover diagnosis and treatment of congenital anomalies and birth defects.

Background

Provisions

Legislative history 
:

See also 

 List of bills in the 115th United States Congress
List of bills in the 116th United States Congress
 List of bills in the 117th United States Congress

References

External links 

 H.R. 1619: Ensuring Lasting Smiles Act on GovTrack
 S. 754: Ensuring Lasting Smiles Act on GovTrack

Proposed legislation of the 117th United States Congress